Belden-Horne House is a historic home located at Fayetteville, Cumberland County, North Carolina. It was built in 1831, and is a -story, three bay by four bay, side-hall plan Late Federal style frame dwelling.  It features a two-tier porch with a hip roof and Palladian entrance. Barge's Tavern was moved to the Belden-Horne House property in 1978.

It was listed on the National Register of Historic Places in 1972.

References

Houses on the National Register of Historic Places in North Carolina
Federal architecture in North Carolina
Houses completed in 1831
Houses in Fayetteville, North Carolina
National Register of Historic Places in Cumberland County, North Carolina